Jenthe Biermans (born 30 October 1995) is a Belgian cyclist, who currently rides for UCI WorldTeam . In May 2019, he was named in the startlist for the 2019 Giro d'Italia.

Major results

2013
 1st  Road race, National Junior Road Championships
 1st Ronde van Vlaanderen Juniores
2015
 2nd Road race, National Under-23 Road Championships
 2nd Paris–Roubaix Espoirs
 5th Paris–Tours Espoirs
2016
 2nd Paris–Roubaix Espoirs
 6th Grote Prijs Marcel Kint
 10th Overall Kreiz Breizh Elites
2018
 9th Overall Tour of Belgium
2019
 10th Binche–Chimay–Binche
2020
 10th Overall Okolo Slovenska
2021
 5th Kuurne–Brussels–Kuurne
2022
 7th Maryland Cycling Classic
 7th Polynormande
2023
 1st Muscat Classic
 2nd Clàssica Comunitat Valenciana 1969

Grand Tour general classification results timeline

References

External links

1995 births
Living people
Belgian male cyclists
People from Geel
Cyclists from Antwerp Province
21st-century Belgian people